Mitchellville is the name of several places:

Places
 Australia
Mitchellville, South Australia, a locality in the  District Council of Franklin Harbour
United States
 Mitchellville, Arkansas
 Mitchellsville, Illinois
 Mitchellville, Iowa
 Mitchellville, Maryland
 Mitchellville, Missouri
 Mitchellville, Tennessee

See also
 Mitchelville